Park Jang-Soon (born April 10, 1968) is a retired South Korean freestyle wrestler, world champion and Olympic champion.

Olympics
He received a silver medal at the 1988 Summer Olympics in Seoul. 
He won a gold medal at the 1992 Summer Olympics in Barcelona. 
At the 1996 Summer Olympics in Atlanta he received a silver medal.

World championships
Park won a gold medal at the 1993 FILA Wrestling World Championships in Toronto, defeating former Olympic and world champion Dave Schultz in the final match. He became the first South Korean wrestler to win both a wrestling world championship and an Olympic gold medal.

References

External links

1968 births
Living people
South Korean wrestlers
Olympic wrestlers of South Korea
Wrestlers at the 1988 Summer Olympics
Wrestlers at the 1992 Summer Olympics
Wrestlers at the 1996 Summer Olympics
South Korean male sport wrestlers
Olympic gold medalists for South Korea
Olympic silver medalists for South Korea
Olympic medalists in wrestling
Asian Games medalists in wrestling
Wrestlers at the 1990 Asian Games
Wrestlers at the 1994 Asian Games
World Wrestling Championships medalists
Medalists at the 1996 Summer Olympics
Medalists at the 1992 Summer Olympics
Medalists at the 1988 Summer Olympics
Medalists at the 1990 Asian Games
Medalists at the 1994 Asian Games
Asian Games gold medalists for South Korea
Asian Games bronze medalists for South Korea
South Korean Buddhists
People from Boryeong
20th-century South Korean people
21st-century South Korean people